King's Highway Historic District may refer to:

King's Highway Historic District (New Jersey), listed on the National Register of Historic Places in Mercer, Middlesex, and Somerset Counties, New Jersey
King's Highway Historic District (Dallas, Texas), listed on the National Register of Historic Places in Dallas County, Texas
Old King's Highway Historic District, listed on the National Register of Historic Places listings in Barnstable County, Massachusetts